Margaret Ross MBE, FBCS is an Emeritus Professor of Software Quality at Southampton Solent University. She serves on the BCSWomen Committee of the British Computer Society.
BCS Women is a specialist group for networking and sharing knowledge amongst women computing professionals. She was awarded an Honorary Doctorate from Staffordshire University, Hon FBCS and the John Ivison Award from the BCS. Margaret's work was recognised in 2008 with the MBE.

Professional qualifications 

 Fellow of the British Computer Society (FBCS)
 European Engineer (Eur Ing)
 Fellow of the Higher Education Academy
 Chartered IT Professional (CITP)
Chartered Engineer (CEng)
Chartered Scientist (CSci)

Appointments 
Conference Director of the annual series of BCS Software Quality Management international conferences (since 1992)
Conference Director of the annual series of international educational BCS INSPIRE conferences (since 1995)
Member of the editorial board, and previously associate editor, Europe, for the Software Quality Journal

Awards 
Honorary Doctorate (2004), Staffordshire University.
Freeman of the City of London
Liveryman of the Worshipful Company of Engineers.
John Ivison Award from the BCS. 
MBE awarded at Buckingham Palace for Services to higher education, in June 2008, by Prince Charles as part of the Queens Birthday Honours List. 
One of 30 women identified in the BCS Women in IT Campaign in 2014 source http://www.bcs.org/content/conWebDoc/50200. Who were then featured in the e-book "Women in IT: Inspiring the next generation" produced by the BCS, The Chartered Institute for IT, as a free downloade-book, from various sources.
One of the 50 women identified by the publication Computer weekly, "Most Influential Women in UK IT 2016"

References

Living people
British women computer scientists
Fellows of the British Computer Society
Members of the Order of the British Empire
English computer scientists
Year of birth missing (living people)